The Sentinel Building is a historic building located at 232 East Broadway in Centralia, Illinois. The building was constructed in 1881 to serve as the headquarters and printing press of the Centralia Sentinel, Centralia's daily newspaper. Renovations in 1922 and 1929 converted the building's design to the Egyptian Revival style; the change reflected the Sentinel's slogan, "Egypt's Greatest Daily", which was chosen since the newspaper served the Little Egypt region. The entrance to the building features yellow reed molding, pharaoh heads on either side, and a cavetto cornice. Terra cotta plaques with Egyptian motifs decorate the building's upper story, and lotus-patterned terra cotta trim adorns its parapet.

The building was added to the National Register of Historic Places on April 15, 1978.

Notes

Buildings and structures in Marion County, Illinois
National Register of Historic Places in Marion County, Illinois
Commercial buildings on the National Register of Historic Places in Illinois
Newspaper headquarters in the United States
Buildings and structures completed in 1881
Egyptian Revival architecture in Illinois